Mount Airy is the name of several places in the Commonwealth of Virginia:
 Mount Airy, Richmond County, Virginia, a mid-Georgian plantation house built for Col. John Tayloe, listed on the National Register of Historic Places (NRHP) in Richmond County and a National Historic Landmark
 Mount Airy (Leesville, Virginia), listed on the NRHP in Bedford County
 Mount Airy (Verona, Virginia), listed on the NRHP in Augusta County
 Mount Airy, Charles City County, Virginia, an unincorporated community
 Mount Airy, Pittsylvania County, Virginia, an unincorporated community
 Mount Airy, Shenandoah County, Virginia, an unincorporated community